The X̱wi7x̱wa Library  is an Indigenous library at the Vancouver campus of the University of British Columbia. The library, which draws its name from the Squamish word for echo, is notable for its approaches to organizing First Nations knowledge and major collections and holdings in a way that expresses Indigenous thought and culture. Holding some 15,000 items, it is fully integrated with the main library of UBC.

History 
X̱wi7x̱wa Library began as a small collection of Aboriginal materials in a mobile home. The collection was maintained in conjunction with UBC's NITEP Indigenous Teacher Education Program.

In 1993, the library became the First Nations House of Learning Library, part of a longhouse for Indigenous students and scholars. The university's senate later established a X̱wi7x̱wa librarian position in 1995, which was first held by Gene Joseph.

The library began digitizing materials related to the First Nations House of Learning Longhouse in 2008, with the goal of sharing university resources with Aboriginal people worldwide.

As of 2015, the library held over 15,000 items, consisting primarily of Aboriginal materials.

Classification and cataloging 
The X̱wi7x̱wa Library uses First Nations House of Learning (FNHL) Subject Headings, a local taxonomy that remedies many of the shortcomings of the Library of Congress Subject Headings with regard to First Nations materials. This classification system arranges First Nations geographically and refers to them by their own names (autonyms), rather than alphabetically by their European names. This is a British Columbia-specific variant of the Brian Deer Classification System, developed by librarian A. Brian Deer (Mohawk) in the late 20th century. This organization system gives priority to relationships in its structure, reflecting an Indigenous worldview.

In 2004, the 11,000 FNHL headings were lost due to a system migration. They were not recovered until 2009.

The library also records a subjective measure of suitability of materials that may be used to teach Indigenous children. This practice rejects dominant conceptions of cataloging as "objective". It recognizes the frequent misrepresentation of Indigenous peoples by mainstream European-Canadian and American cultures.

References

External links 
 Official site
 Classification system
 Bibliography of publications about X̱wi7x̱wa Library

University of British Columbia libraries
Academic libraries in Canada
First Nations librarianship